Joseph Rea Reed (March 12, 1835 – April 2, 1925) was an Iowa Supreme Court justice, one-term Republican U.S. Representative from Iowa's 9th congressional district in southwestern Iowa, and chief justice of a specialized federal court.

Biography
Born in Ashland County, Ohio, Reed attended the common schools and Vermillion Institution in Hayesville, Ohio from 1854 to 1857.
He moved to Adel, Iowa, in 1857.
After studying law, he was admitted to the bar in 1859 and engaged in the practice of law at Adel until 1861.

In July 1861, upon the outbreak of the American Civil War, Reed enlisted as first lieutenant in the 2nd Iowa Independent Battery Light Artillery. He was promoted to captain in October 1864, and served until June 10, 1865. Following the war, he resumed the practice of law in Adel. He served as member of the Iowa Senate in 1866 and 1868, moving to Council Bluffs, Iowa, in 1869.

In 1872, he became a judge. He served as judge of the district court from 1872 to 1884. He was then elevated to the Iowa Supreme Court, where he served from January 1, 1884, until he resigned on February 28, 1889 (including two months as chief justice).

In 1888, Reed received the Republican nomination for election as the 9th congressional district's representative in the U.S. House, after incumbent Republican Joseph Lyman declined to seek a third term. After winning the general election, Reed served in the Fifty-first Congress. However, Reed was not re-elected, but was defeated in 1890 by Democrat Thomas Bowman as part of the Democrats' landslide victory. He served in Congress from  March 4, 1889 to March 3, 1891.

In June 1891, he was named by President Benjamin Harrison as the chief justice of the new United States Court of Private Land Claims, a court created to decide land claims guaranteed by the Treaty of Guadalupe Hidalgo, in the territories of New Mexico, Arizona, and Utah, and in the states of Nevada, Colorado, and Wyoming.  He served on that court from 1891 to 1904. He then resumed the practice of law in Council Bluffs, where he died on April 2, 1925. He was interred in Walnut Hill Cemetery.

References

1835 births
1925 deaths
Republican Party Iowa state senators
Iowa state court judges
Justices of the Iowa Supreme Court
People from Ashland County, Ohio
People from Adel, Iowa
Union Army officers
People of Iowa in the American Civil War
Politicians from Council Bluffs, Iowa
United States Court of Private Land Claims judges
United States Article I federal judges appointed by Benjamin Harrison
19th-century American judges
Republican Party members of the United States House of Representatives from Iowa
Chief Justices of the Iowa Supreme Court